The Prayer of Solomon is a prayer by King Solomon described in 1 Kings 8:22-53 and 2 Chronicles 6:12-42. This prayer is said to have occurred at the dedication of the temple of Solomon, which also became known as the First Temple. The wording and thinking of the prayer have much in common with the language of Deuteronomy.

A shorter prayer of Solomon is also found in some Latin Bibles at the end of or immediately following the Book of Sirach (also known as Ecclesiasticus). It sometimes appears as the fifty-second chapter of Sirach or (as in the Gutenberg Bible) as a separate prayer.

References

Year of work missing
Solomon
Jewish prayer and ritual texts
Books of Kings
Deuterocanonical books